Marcin Nowacki (born 12 February 1981 in Brzeg) is a Polish footballer who currently plays as a midfielder for Miedź Legnica.

Career
He was released from Wisła Płock on 30 June 2011. In July 2011, he joined Miedź Legnica.

Nowacki has made one appearance for the Poland national football team.

References

External links
 
 

1981 births
Living people
Polish footballers
Poland international footballers
Ekstraklasa players
Korona Kielce players
Dyskobolia Grodzisk Wielkopolski players
Odra Wodzisław Śląski players
Ruch Chorzów players
Wisła Płock players
Miedź Legnica players
People from Brzeg
Sportspeople from Opole Voivodeship
Association football midfielders